Inge Thomas Dahl Debes (15 May 1882 – 25 November 1945) is a Norwegian jurist, editor and politician.

He was born in Kragerø. He was married to Sigrid Torgersen (1885–1936) from 1905 to 1913. They divorced and she later married Jakob Friis (1914 to 1924) and Emil Stang, Jr. (from 1925).

Debes edited the Norwegian Labour Party publication Det 20de Århundre in the early 1910s, but joined the Social Democratic Labour Party of Norway after the party split in 1921.

From 1925 he chaired the organization Norsk forening for sosialt arbeid. He was a judge in Oslo City Court from 1926, and published several books. In 1945 he chaired the commission that delivered a controversial document on "war children" to the Norwegian Ministry of Social Affairs, which was stopped by Sven Oftedal and never reached the Parliament of Norway for deliberation.

References

1882 births
1945 deaths
Norwegian judges
Norwegian magazine editors
Labour Party (Norway) politicians
Social Democratic Labour Party of Norway politicians
People from Kragerø